Chromosome 9 open reading frame 16 is a protein in humans that is encoded by the C9orf16 gene.

References

External links